The Château de Rustéphan is a small, ruined 15th–16th century manor-house in the Finistère département of France. It is located in the small rural town of Nizon, near Pont-Aven. It was erected by Jean Du Faou, chamberlain of France and grand seneschal of Brittany, who built the domaine in 1420.

History
According to tradition, the original manor was built by the son of a Duke of Brittany, named Étienne, Count of Penthièvre and seigneur of Nizon, who died in 1137.

The current structure was built by Jean du Faou. According to some historians, it was a former hunting lodge of the Dukes of Brittany, in the fifteenth and sixteenth centuries. Its position, at the entrance of large woods that covers the entire parish of Nizon, and which abounds in game, can make this opinion very plausible.

During the French Revolution, more than half of the manor-house was burned and destroyed.

Architecture
Of the ancient manor-house nothing remains but two sections about twenty metres in height, surrounded by ivy, brambles and weeds. The section on the left, the gable wall, contains a corner turret on corbelling, immense hooded fireplaces as well as the remains of some stone cross-pieced windows. The section on the right contains the staircase tower, as well as some remains of internal walls, the entrance vestibule, etc. The main entry door is topped by a Gothic arch. The former wall of the front façade has fallen away and the stones carried off in the last century.

It is believed that the manor-house once consisted of a rectangular corps de logis and had turrets at each of the corners, as well as the large central staircase tower.

Legends
Nearly all the residents of Nizon believe that the ghosts of former village residents Géneviève de Rustéphan and Iannick ar Flécher still haunt the château today. This true 16th century story is a tragic tale of a commoner (Iannick) who fell in love with the daughter (Géneviève) of the local seigneur of Faou. Their two families did not approve of the relationship, and Iannick was forced to become a priest and leave town. The young woman died broken-hearted and her spirit is said to haunt the ruins to this day. It has been reported that the apparition of an old, sad priest (Iannick) has also been seen lurking around the ruins.  Village inhabitants used to gather in the grassy space in front the ruins of the château to dance and celebrate various holidays, however after numerous reported sightings of unexplained figures seen watching them from within the ruins, they learned to stay away from the place on moonlit nights when the spirits were said to appear.

Preservation
The local people of Nizon are trying to save the remains of the château from further vandalism and effects of the weather. There is an effort underway to reinforce the walls and tower and try to keep the structure from falling down.

The castle has been listed as a Monument historique (historical monument) by the French Ministry of Culture since 1926.

See also
 List of castles in France

Notes

External links
 Rustéphan, au coeur des récits, terre de légendes... (in French)
 Les Amants Impossibles (The Impossible Lovers) in French

Châteaux in Finistère
Ruined castles in Brittany
Monuments historiques of Finistère